The Shenyang FC-31 Gyrfalcon, also known as the J-31 is a Chinese prototype mid-sized twinjet 5th-generation fighter aircraft developed by Shenyang Aircraft Corporation (SAC). The official nickname published by SAC is "Gyrfalcon", though it has also been referred to as the "F-60" or "J-21 Snowy Owl" in some media reports, or "Falcon Hawk" by some military enthusiasts. J-XX nomenclatures in the Chinese military are reserved for programs launched and financed by the People's Liberation Army, while the FC-31 plane was developed independently as a private venture by the aircraft manufacturer.

Development

Origin
While the Chengdu J-20 stealth fighter was officially endorsed by the People's Liberation Army Air Force after Chengdu Aerospace Corporation's proposal won the PLAAF bid for the next-generation jet fighter, Shenyang Aircraft Corporation pressed on and developed a private project aiming to secure potential export customers.

A photo of a model labeled F-60 was posted on the Internet in September 2011. In June 2012, photos and phone camera video clips started to emerge on internet regarding a heavily overwrapped fighter plane airframe (widely suspected to be the F-60 prototype) being road-transferred on a highway, earning the nickname "the zongzi plane" among Chinese netizens, though some suspect it of merely being an L-15 trainer aircraft.  Pictures of a possibly fully assembled aircraft parking on an airfield emerged on 15 or 16 September 2012. The F-60 is reported to be the export version, where the J-31 would be the domestic Chinese version of the same fighter. Chinese aviation expert Xu Yongling has called the J-31 an export-oriented low-end latest generation warplane.

Public reveal
A -scale model of the J-31 was shown at the China International Aviation & Aerospace Exhibition 2012, hinting at a desire to offer the aircraft for export, as an alternative for those countries that cannot purchase the F-35.

The J-31 airframe was publicly unveiled on 12 November 2014 at Zhuhai Airshow. In TV broadcast of the unveiling, AVIC chairman Lin Zuoming claimed that funding for the aircraft came entirely from the company, with no input from military.

As typical in flight displays of fighter jets, afterburners were engaged throughout the maneuvers.  Nevertheless, Reuben Johnson of ainonline.com claimed it to be evidence of aerodynamic inefficiencies, concluding that the aircraft "bleeds a lot of energy and the pilot had a hard time keeping the nose up."  Flights were done when the jet was "clean," so results would be worse when fitted with a combat loadout.  However, a large-scale model of the FC-31 on display did show some detail changes of configuration compared to the flying prototype.

At the 2015 Dubai Airshow, AVIC released more details regarding the aircraft's capabilities.  The company revealed it is still looking for a partner in the aircraft project, and is actively marketing the aircraft to People's Liberation Army Air Force.  AVIC's plan was to have a production model first flight by 2019.

Design revision
It is very likely that the J-31 will be inducted as a carrier-based naval fighter. In an interview with China's state-run media, FC-31's chief designer Sun Cong expressed that the aircraft would follow his J-15 onto China's aircraft carriers. There has also been reports that the PLAAN has urged Shenyang to develop a carrier-compatible version of J-31.

In 2015, Jiangsu A-Star Aviation Industries Company marketed its EOTS-86 infra-red search and track as a possible addition to the J-31. An improved prototype, with modifications to the vertical stabilizers, wings, and airframe, an electro-optical targeting system, a larger payload, improvements in stealth, and upgraded electronics, made its maiden flight in December 2016.

In November 2018, an Aviation Week article stated that the FC-31 program has received government funding and is being sought after by both the PLANAF and PLAAF, according to official sources. In June 2020, reports surfaced that a third variant of FC-31, albeit a more production-ready version with smoother lines, a bigger radome for a bigger radar, and a closer alignment of control surfaces to reduce the radar signature, had been developed. The "new fighter" has been referred to by some as J-35.

Naval variant
On October 29, 2021, the modified naval variant of the FC-31, dubbed J-35 by commentators, made its maiden flight. It is intended to operate from the forthcoming Type 003 aircraft carrier with an electromagnetic Aircraft Launch System. The naval variant is based on the second prototype of the FC-31, but also includes a catapult launch bar and a wing-fold mechanism.

Operational history

Flight testing
The prototype conducted a high-speed taxiing test and briefly became airborne. On 31 October 2012, prototype No. 31001 conducted the model's maiden flight. It was accompanied by two J-11 fighters in a ten-minute test flight with its landing gear lowered.

With the maiden test flight of the prototype No.31001 on 30 October 2012, China became the second nation after the 1991 Advanced Tactical Fighter fly off, to have two stealth fighter designs in field-testing at the same time. The aircraft has continued a limited test program, with footage emerging of further flights which took place in February 2013.

Design (2013-2019)

J-31 incorporates certain stealth characteristics such as forward-swept intake ramps with diverterless supersonic inlet (DSI) bumps, a two-piece bubble canopy, contoured weapon bays and two oblique vertical stabilizers.

Airframe
The J-31 is smaller than the Chengdu J-20.  The use of twin-wheel nose landing gear led to speculations that the J-31 may have been intended to be a carrier-based fighter. Bill Sweetman has cited several improvements to the F-35C design files the Chinese may have acquired in the J-31. Analyst David Bignell argues that J-31 is rather based on F-22, due to the similarity in platform, shape, aerodynamics and airframe configuration, instead of F-35.

The J-31 has two internal weapons bays that can each carry two medium-range missiles, along with two heavy hardpoints and one light hardpoint on each wing, but while it seems to have added an additional light hardpoint to each wing over the capacity of the F-35, it seems to lack the capacity of the F-35 to mount a centerline gunnery or jamming pod.

Officials from AVIC claimed that additive manufacturing was extensively used on the aircraft, resulting in 50% reduction in components compared to similar aircraft.  However, the resulting airframe cannot be disassembled, and the static test frame had to be transported in whole as a consequence.

Engines
According to Vladimir Barkovsky of Russian Aircraft Corporation MiG (formerly known as the Mikoyan-Gurevich Design Bureau), the engines on the prototype aircraft are RD-93s. However, China already has an engine similar to the RD-93, the Guizhou WS-13 currently installed on the JF-17 which has the same thrust and size of the Russian RD-93. Lin Zuoming, chairman of China's AVIC, has said that he hopes to put domestic engines on the fighter. As the Chinese build up confidence in newer, more reliable and powerful domestic engines, they may be able to power the J-31 sooner than the larger J-20 and in greater numbers.

Payload
The J-31 can carry  of payload, with four munitions totaling  internally, and  carried on six external hardpoints; primary armaments include the PL-10 short-range missile and PL-12 medium-range air-to-air missile. 4 PL-21 missiles can also be fitted inside the J-31's internal weapons bay.

Stealth
The J-31 is speculated to use stealth coatings instead of "baked in" fiber-mat stealth. Officials from AVIC claim the aircraft to be stealthy against L-band and Ku-band radars, and would be low-observable against a number of multi-spectrum sensors. The engine nozzles are apparently being redesigned to reduce radar and infrared signatures.

Recent updates (2020)

Payload 
The maximum take-off weight of this J-31 increased from 25,000 kg to 28,000 kg.

Engines 
Shenyang Aircraft Corporation has officially confirmed that J-31 is installing WS-19 engine, which has a maximum thrust of 12 tons, compared to WS-13 whose thrust is 9 tons. The total thrust of the jet has been increased from 18 tons to 24 tons. The maximum range of this jet was also extended to 1250 km. It can also supercruise.

Stealth 
The J-31 is now using stealth coatings instead of "baked in" fiber-mat stealth.

Foreign reactions 
U.S. military and industry officials believe that once the J-31 enters service, it will likely be more than a match for existing fourth-generation fighters like the F-15 Eagle, F-16 Fighting Falcon, and F/A-18E/F Super Hornet.  They suggest that the capability of the J-31 against the newest fighters, such as the U.S. F-22 and F-35, would depend on factors such as numbers of platforms, quality of pilots, and capabilities of radars and other sensors.

India (HAL AMCA) and Japan (Mitsubishi F-X) are pursuing their own programs to develop fifth and sixth generation fighters to counter PRC's developments while China's some other neighbors are considering purchase of F-35 or Su-57 to foster their capabilities.

Vladimir Barkovsky of Russian Aircraft Corporation MiG has stated that, despite some design flaws, the J-31 "looks like a good machine." Although it contains features already in use on the U.S. fifth generation fighter designs, it is "not a copy but a well done indigenous design."

Controversy
In April 2009, the Wall Street Journal reported that computer spies, allegedly Chinese, had penetrated the database of the Joint Strike Fighter program and acquired terabytes of secret information. AVIC is alleged to have incorporated the stolen knowledge into the J-31.

Specifications (FC-31 estimated)
Because the aircraft is in development, these specifications—based on available imagery—are approximate and preliminary.

See also

References

External links 

Stealth aircraft
Shenyang aircraft
Twinjets
2010s Chinese fighter aircraft
Mid-wing aircraft
Aircraft first flown in 2012